The porthole catfish or slender catfish, Dianema longibarbis, is a tropical freshwater fish belonging to the subfamily Corydoradinae of the family Callichthyidae.  It originates in inland waters in South America, and is found in the Amazon River basin in Brazil and Peru.

The fish will grow in length up to 8.2 centimetres (3.2 in).  It natively inhabits waters with a pH range of 5.5 to 7.5, a hardness of 2 - 20 DH, and a temperature of 22° - 26 °C (72° - 79 °F).

References 

Callichthyidae
Fish of South America
Fish of the Amazon basin
Fish described in 1872